The Teichfuss Balilla was an Italian single seat primary glider, designed by Luigi Teichfuss and flown in 1939.

Design and development
In 1929 Luigi Teichfuss produced the Nibio I, his first primary glider with a conventional fuselage rather than an open girder frame. Ten years later he designed an improved version, the Balilla.  It was a simple, low cost, robust, high wing, strut braced monoplane with an unswept, constant chord, elliptically tipped wing.  Mounted with dihedral, this was supported over the fuselage on a narrow pedestal and braced on each side by a parallel pair of faired lift struts from the lower fuselage to the wings at about half span.

Its fuselage was wood framed, flat sided and plywood skinned. Its cockpit, open but with a small windscreen, was immediately ahead of the wing leading edge; there were no instruments. The Balilla's tail surfaces were all straight edged: the tailplane, single strut braced from below, had a sharply swept leading edge and carried elevators with angled tips and a cut-out for rudder movement. The vertical tail was tapered with a squared tip; the rudder reached to the keel, where it was protected by a wire loop tail bumper. Elevators and the rudder lacked aerodynamic balances.  A conventional skid, running from the nose to below the wing trailing edge formed the undercarriage.

The Ballila first flew in 1939. Ten were built, serving all the gliding schools of the R.U.N.A.  It could be winch launched and was straightforward to fly, training novice pilots to their B-certificate.

Specifications

See also

References

External links
Göttingen 535 airfoil

[[Category:Teichfuss aircraft|Balilla]
1930s Italian sailplanes]
Aircraft first flown in 1939
High-wing aircraft